Hippeastrum psittacinum (Parrot Amaryllis) is a flowering perennial herbaceous bulbous plant, in the family Amaryllidaceae, native to Brazil.

Description 
Leaves, up to 8, strap like, length 45 cm. height 60 cm. Flowers, four trumpet shaped. Tubes short, green-white with spreading lobes, crimson stripes, and wavy crimson margins.

Taxonomy 
Described by John Bellenden Ker Gawler in 1817 as Amaryllis, but transferred to Hippeastrum by William Herbert in 1821.
To have been the first to bring within the sphere of science and into culture an equal number of plants, belonging to a same remote region, of a same genus, and all interesting, either on the score of curiosity or beauty, within little more than two years, has probably never before been the chance of any single collector in Europe. The bulb was sent about 3 years ago by Mr. E. Woodford, from Rio Janeiro; and flowered in Mr. Griffin's hothouse at South Lambeth in March last.’ Ker Gawler

Heterotypic Synonyms 
 Amaryllis illustris Vell., Fl. Flumin. 3: 131 (1829).
 Leopoldia illustris (Vell.) M.Roem., Fam. Nat. Syn. Monogr. 4: 130 (1847).
 Hippeastrum decoratum Lem., Jard. Fleur. 4: t. 338 (1854).
 Amaryllis psittacina var. decorata (Lem.) Traub & Uphof, Herbertia 6: 154 (1940).
 Hippeastrum illustre (Vell.) Dutilh, Taxon 46: 17 (1997).

Etymology 
psittacinum: Latin like a parrot

References

Sources 
 
 GBIF: Hippeastrum petiolatum
 Pacific Bulb Society: Hippeastrum petiolatum
 
 Zuloaga, F. O., O. Morrone, M. J. Belgrano, C. Marticorena & E. Marchesi. (eds.) 2008. Catálogo de las Plantas Vasculares del Cono Sur (Argentina, Sur de Brasil, Chile, Paraguay y Uruguay). Monogr. Syst. Bot. Missouri Bot. Gard. 107. 2008 
 International Bulb Society: Hippeastrum petiolatum (image)
 Forzza, R. C. et al. 2010. 2010 Lista de espécies Flora do Brasil

Flora of South America
psittacinum
Garden plants of South America